Rustem Ymeri was an Albanian politician and mayor of Elbasan from 1929 through 1930.

References

Year of birth missing
Year of death missing
Mayors of Elbasan
Mayors of Korçë